Nevsu (or Nebsu, Hebrew: נֶבְסוּ, Amharic: ነፍሱ) Is an Israeli sitcom, winner of the International Emmy Award for the comedy series of 2018.

Nevsu was first broadcast on March 9, 2017, on Israeli Channel 2, as part of the "Reshet" franchise. The series was created and written by Yossi Vasa, Shai Ben Attar, and Liat Shavit, directed by Shai Ben Attar and starring Yossi Vasa, Meyrav Feldman, Hana Laszlo, Gadi Yagil, Meskie Shibru, and Solomon Marisha. After seven episodes on 6 April 2017 the first season ended. The second season aired on November 6, 2017, after the split of Channel 2, and was broadcast on Reshet 13 of the network.

In September 2017 the series was sold to the American FOX network. On November 12, 2017, it was announced that the series got into the international television award ceremony of C21Media in London where it was nominated as the best comedy.

Plot
"Nevsu" focuses on a Jewish-Ethiopian-Israeli family whose son (Yossi Vasa) is married to a Jewish-Ashkenazi-Israeli woman (Meyrav Feldman).

References

Channel 2 (Israeli TV channel) original programming
2017 Israeli television series debuts
Israeli television sitcoms
International Emmy Award for best comedy series winners
2010s sitcoms